Mesen (also Romanized as Masen; also known as Mesīn, and Misin) is a village in Armand Rural District, in the Central District of Lordegan County, Chaharmahal and Bakhtiari Province, Iran. At the 2006 census, its population was 1,126, in 231 families.

References 

Populated places in Lordegan County